is a train station in Nichinan, Miyazaki Prefecture, Japan.

Lines

Layout 
The station consists of a side platform serving a single track at grade with a siding. The station building is a simple concrete block structure which houses a ticket window and a waiting area. The station is not staffed by JR Kyushu but some types of tickets are available from a kan'i itaku agent on site who manages the ticket window.

Adjacent stations

History
The line was then extended northwards in phases, reaching  by 1935. The track was extended further north with  opening as the northern terminus on 1 March 1936. On the same day, Nangō opened as an intermediate station the new track. The route was designated the Nichinan Line on 8 May 1963. With the privatization of JNR on 1 April 1987, the station came under the control of JR Kyushu.

Passenger statistics
In fiscal 2016, the station was used by an average of 167 passengers (boarding only) per day.

See also
List of railway stations in Japan

References

External links
Nangō (JR Kyushu)

Railway stations in Miyazaki Prefecture
Railway stations in Japan opened in 1936